Lectionary 314 (Gregory-Aland), designated by siglum ℓ 314 (in the Gregory-Aland numbering) is a Greek manuscript of the New Testament, on parchment. Palaeographically it has been assigned to the 12th century. The manuscript has survived in a fragmentary condition.

Description 

The codex contains Lessons from the Gospels of lectionary (Evangelistarium).
It is written in Greek minuscule letters, on two parchment leaves, 2 columns per page, 21 lines per page.

History 

Gregory dated the manuscript to the 12th century. It has been assigned by the Institute for New Testament Textual Research (INTF) to the 12th century.

Of the history of the codex ℓ 314 nothing is known until the year 1864, when it was in the possession of a dealer at Janina in Epeiros. It was then purchased from him by a representative of Baroness Burdett-Coutts (1814–1906), a philanthropist, together with other Greek manuscripts (among them lectionaries ℓ 313 and ℓ 315). They were transported to England in 1870-1871.

The manuscript was added to the list of New Testament manuscripts by F. H. A. Scrivener (495) Caspar René Gregory (number 314e).

It used to be held in London (Burdett-Coutts II. 14). The codex is now housed in the library of the Brown University (Koopmann Collect. B X 360) in Providence, Rhode Island.

The manuscript is not cited in critical editions of the Greek New Testament (UBS4, NA28).

See also 

 List of New Testament lectionaries
 Biblical manuscript
 Textual criticism
 Lectionary 228

Notes and references

Bibliography

External links 

 

Greek New Testament lectionaries
12th-century biblical manuscripts